Tupo is a crater in the southern hemisphere of the dwarf planet Ceres, located at 32.35° S, 88.38° E. It has a diameter of 36 km. The crater is named after a Polynesian deity, that was invoked on the island Mangareva during the planting of turmeric.

References

Impact craters on asteroids
Surface features of Ceres